Magadha is a genus of achilid planthoppers in the family Achilidae. There are at least 20 described species in Magadha.

Species
These 22 species belong to the genus Magadha:

 Magadha basimaculata Long, Yang & Chen, 2014 c g
 Magadha cervina Fennah, 1956 g
 Magadha densimaculosa Long, Yang & Chen, 2014 c g
 Magadha eusordida Chen, Yang & Wilson, 1989 c g
 Magadha fennahi Liang, 2007 c g
 Magadha flavisigna (Walker, 1851) c g
 Magadha formosana Matsumura, 1914 c g
 Magadha guangdongensis Chou & Wang, 1985 c g
 Magadha guangzhouensi Wang, 1989 c g
 Magadha gyirongensis Wang & Wang, 1988 c g
 Magadha intumescentia Long, Yang & Chen, 2014 c g
 Magadha metasequoiae Fennah, 1956 c g
 Magadha nebulosa Distant, 1906 c g
 Magadha pinnata Chen, Yang & Wilson, 1989 c g
 Magadha redunca Chen, Yang & Wilson, 1989 c g
 Magadha semitransversa Chen, Yang & Wilson, 1989 c g
 Magadha shaanxiensis Chou & Wang, 1985 c g
 Magadha taibaishanensis Wang, 1989 c g
 Magadha w-maculata Chou & Wang, 1985 c g
 Magadha wuyishanana Chou & Wang, 1985 c g
 Magadha yadongensis Wang & Wang, 1988 c g
 Magadha yangia Wang & Huang, 1995 c g

Data sources: i = ITIS, c = Catalogue of Life, g = GBIF, b = Bugguide.net

References

Further reading

 
 
 
 
 

Achilidae
Auchenorrhyncha genera